Ladislav Móder (2 December 1945 – 2 December 2006) was a Slovak footballer. He was born in Tvrdošovce and spent most of his playing career with ŠK Slovan Bratislava, winning the Czechoslovak league in 1970 and the Czechoslovak Cup in 1968.

External links
Obituary in denník šport

1945 births
2006 deaths
Czechoslovak footballers
ŠK Slovan Bratislava players
Association footballers not categorized by position
People from Nové Zámky District
Sportspeople from the Nitra Region